Robson dos Santos Fernandes, (born 30 May 1991), simply known as Robson, is a Brazilian footballer who plays as a forward for Coritiba.

Club career
Robson was born in Campinas, and played youth football for Ponte Preta. He made his senior debut for the club on 28 February 2010, starting in a 1–3 Campeonato Paulista away loss against Grêmio Barueri.

Robson subsequently moved to São Caetano, and had loan stints at Comercial-SP, Anapolina, Ferroviária and Rio Claro before establishing himself as a starter in 2014. In the following year, he was Azulão's top goalscorer in Série D with eight goals, but still left the club in December 2015.

On 14 December 2015 Robson signed for Série B club Paraná, until the following November. After scoring eight league goals in 21 matches, he renewed until the end of 2017 with the club, and was loaned to São Paulo on 9 September 2016.

Robson made his Série A debut on 11 September 2016, coming on as a late substitute for Kelvin in a 3–1 home win against Figueirense.

Honours
Fortaleza
Campeonato Cearense: 2021, 2022
Copa do Nordeste: 2022

References

External links

1991 births
Living people
Sportspeople from Campinas
Brazilian footballers
Association football forwards
Campeonato Brasileiro Série A players
Campeonato Brasileiro Série B players
Campeonato Brasileiro Série C players
Campeonato Brasileiro Série D players
Associação Atlética Ponte Preta players
Associação Desportiva São Caetano players
Comercial Futebol Clube (Ribeirão Preto) players
Associação Atlética Anapolina players
Associação Ferroviária de Esportes players
Rio Claro Futebol Clube players
Paraná Clube players
São Paulo FC players
Coritiba Foot Ball Club players
Fortaleza Esporte Clube players